Holy Enchilada! is the sixth book in the Hank Zipzer book series by Henry Winkler and Lin Oliver.

Plot summary
Hank has been chosen to host a Japanese boy named Yoshi! Hank also needs to prepare some enchiladas for his school multi-cultural day. But, he may have added too much chili powder... and then the trouble starts!

Main characters
Hank Zipzer – Hank is a fourth-grader at P.S. 87 who has dyslexia. Frankie Townsend and Ashley Wong are his two best friends. His real name is Henry Daniel.
Frankie Townsend – Frankie is Hank's best friend who is described as being very smart.
Ashley Wong – Ashley, dubbed Ashweena by Hank and Frankie, is Hank's other best friend who loves rhinestones.
Nick McKelty – Nick, dubbed "Nick the Tick" by the Magik 3 (the group formed by Hank, Frank, and Ashley), is their rival. He often teases Hank for his dyslexia and is described as being annoying and a braggart.
Papa Pete – Hank's grandfather, with whom him and his friends are very close to.
Emily Zipzer – Hank's younger sister. She is in the third grade at P.S. 87 and is described as being very smart, but also annoying. She has a pet iguana named Katherine.
Robert Upchurch – Robert is described as scrawny and a nerd.
Yoshi Morimoto - A boy Hank hosts from Japan.
Mr. Morimoto - Yoshi's father.
Randi Zipzer– Hank's mother, who runs the Crunchy Pickle Deli and insists that the family eat healthily.
Stanley Zipzer– Hank's father, who is obsessed with crossword puzzles.
Mrs. Adolf – Hank's teacher. She is described as being very boring and strict.

References

External links
Official Website

2004 American novels
2004 children's books
American children's novels